Irvin Lee Pankey (born February 15, 1958) is a former American football offensive lineman who played twelve seasons in the National Football League, mainly for the Los Angeles Rams. He played tight end and offensive tackle at Penn State and was a team captain in 1979. He attended Aberdeen High School in Aberdeen, Maryland.

Personal life
During his playing career at Penn State, he reached out to Betsy Sailor, a student who had been raped by then-Penn State player Todd Hodne in 1978, and had experienced harassment after having testified against Hodne at his trial. In a 2022 ESPN story on Hodne, who would sexually assault nearly a dozen other women before being convicted of murder, Sailor recalled Pankey telling her, "I just wanted to let you know that I was in the courtroom today and I listened to what you had to say. And I believe every word that you said. And, you will never have to be afraid, or be alone again. I will be by your side." Pankey and Sailor would lose contact after they graduated from Penn State, but would be reunited while the ESPN story was being researched.

Pankey has twin sons who played college football for Oregon State; Keith Pankey played linebacker, and his brother, Kevin, was a tight end. He has a daughter, Kiley, who attended Mt. Whitney High School in Visalia, California.
Pankey served as a professor and offensive line coach at the College of the Sequoias in Visalia, California. Pankey also helps out at football camps such as Linemen Inc.

References

1958 births
Living people
People from Aberdeen, Maryland
Sportspeople from the Baltimore metropolitan area
Players of American football from Maryland
American football offensive tackles
Penn State Nittany Lions football players
Los Angeles Rams players
Indianapolis Colts players